Bamrung Boonprom (born 22 April 1977) is a retired Thai professional footballer who played as a striker. He was awarded the Asian Young Footballer of the Year by the Asian Football Confederation (AFC) in 1996. He played at 1997 FIFA U-17 World Championship in Egypt.

International career

Honours

Individual
 Asian Young Footballer of the Year : 1996

References

1977 births
Living people
Bamrung Boonprom
Bamrung Boonprom
Association football forwards
Bamrung Boonprom
Bamrung Boonprom
Bamrung Boonprom
Asian Young Footballer of the Year winners